Messrs. Joseph Crosfield and Son in 1905 for the realisation of an interconnection of a new part of the factory south of Mersey river with the existing factory part north of Mersey river in 1905. 

As there was vessel traffic with tall ships on Mersey river at those days, a transporter bridge with a clearance of 22.86 metres (75 ft) was chosen for the realization of the desired crossing.
The transporter bridge was realized as suspension bridge with wind guy cables, which were fixed on crossbars at the support towers. While the tower on the south site was completely free-standing, that on the north bank was erected on the roof of a warehouse building of the factory. The bridge had a span width of 76.2 metres (250 ft) and a gondola capable of transporting a load of 2.5 tons.

In 1915, it was supplemented by the still existing Warrington Transporter Bridge, as it was not able to handle heavy loads. In later years, it was decommissioned and converted into a pipeline bridge before it was demolished.

External links 

Transporter bridges
Bridges completed in 1905
Buildings and structures in Warrington
Demolished bridges in England